Jon Masalin (born 29 January 1986) is a retired Finnish football goalkeeper. He is currently working as a goalkeeper coach at Fredrikstad FK.

He was on spells with Aston Villa and SC Heerenveen, and has later played for Norwegian clubs Notodden and HamKam, before he joined Fredrikstad in 2010.

Career statistics

References

Living people
1986 births
Finnish footballers
Finland under-21 international footballers
Association football goalkeepers
FC Jokerit players
SC Heerenveen players
Aston Villa F.C. players
FC Hämeenlinna players
Notodden FK players
Hamarkameratene players
Fredrikstad FK players
Norwegian First Division players
Eliteserien players
Finnish expatriate footballers
Expatriate footballers in England
Expatriate footballers in Norway
Finnish expatriate sportspeople in England
Finnish expatriate sportspeople in Norway
Footballers from Helsinki
21st-century Finnish people